Metropolitan International University (MIU) is a secular private university licensed and accredited by National Council for Higher Education (UNCHE) in Uganda. MIU is located in Kisoro in South Western Uganda and has a second campus in Kampala, Namungoona on plot 281 along Nakibinge road.

Overview 
MIU was established in late 2017 by private Ugandan individuals with a license to operate as university, offering Diploma , Bachelors courses and Masters programs. It is currently ranked 33rd  in Uganda and as the best University in Kisoro.

On 25 February 2022, it held its fourth  graduation ceremony at the main campus in which a total number of 1323 students were crowned with different qualifications at the levels of degrees, diplomas, certificates.

The function was presided over by the university chancellor Philemon Mateke alongside his vice chancellor Arineitwe Julius.
The guest of honor was the first deputy prime minister and minister for east African affairs Rebecca Alitwala Kadaga alongside the state minister for youth and children affairs Sarah Mateke Nyirabashitsi.
  
The university has a board of trustees, university senate and university council that oversees all university activities. Currently the Chancellor is Dr Philemon Mateke and Vice Chancellor is Dr Julius Arinaitwe.

Academics 
As of 2019 Metropolitan University offers the following programs:

Faculty of Education and Humanities

Faculty of Science and Technology

Faculty of Business Administration and Management Science 

Bachelor of Procurement and Logistics Management

Bachelor of Tourism and Hotel Management

Bachelor of Science in Accounting and Finance

Post Graduate Programs

Recent developments 
MIU held its inaugural graduation in on 21st February, 2019 in Kisoro Municipality and has since had one more graduation ceremony.

See also 
 List of Universities in Uganda
 Education in Uganda

References 

Universities and colleges in Uganda
Educational institutions established in 2017
2017 establishments in Uganda
Kisoro
Private universities and colleges in Africa